Meigsville Township is one of the fourteen townships of Morgan County, Ohio, United States.  The 2000 census found 894 people in the township.

Geography
Located in the eastern part of the county, it borders the following townships:
Bristol Township - north
Manchester Township - northeast corner
Center Township - east
Windsor Township - south
Morgan Township - west

No municipalities are located in Meigsville Township.

Name and history
It is the only Meigsville Township statewide.

Government
The township is governed by a three-member board of trustees, who are elected in November of odd-numbered years to a four-year term beginning on the following January 1. Two are elected in the year after the presidential election and one is elected in the year before it. There is also an elected township fiscal officer, who serves a four-year term beginning on April 1 of the year after the election, which is held in November of the year before the presidential election. Vacancies in the fiscal officership or on the board of trustees are filled by the remaining trustees.

As of 2007, the trustees are Kent Coyle, Darren Hann, and Terry Kidd, and the clerk is Masel Johnson.

References

External links
County website

Townships in Morgan County, Ohio
Townships in Ohio